On 6 September 1978, the BBC broadcast Lena Zavaroni on Broadway was chosen for the 1978 Golden Sea Swallow Festival, where it won the silver award.

The show opened with Lena carrying a suitcase and singing the song "On Broadway". This lead into Lena being joined by The Dougie Squires Dancers and they performed a medley of "On Broadway", "Broadway Rhythm" and "Lullaby of Broadway".

The dancers leave the stage and Lena performed the song "Tomorrow", the dancers return and they perform the song "New York, New York" with Lena.

Lena and her dancers returned to the stage along with Paul Nicholas dressed for the film musical Grease and perform a medley of songs from it.

The dancers leave the stage and Lena is joined by the mime artist Adrian Hedley. Lena sings the song "Over the Rainbow" while Adrian Hedley performs a mime based on the song.

Lena then performs "Broadway Baby" form the musical Follies. Lena is again joined by her dancers and they perform the song "Wouldn't It Be Loverly" from the musical My Fair Lady, then Lena is joined by Wayne Sleep and they perform the song "Anything You Can Do" from the musical Annie Get Your Gun. Lena then sings "My Favorite Things" from the musical The Sound of Music.

The dancers, Adrian Hedley and Wayne Sleep return to the stage singing "One" (aka "One Singular Sensation") from the musical A Chorus Line, then Lena joins them and they sing "Applause" from the musical Applause.

The show closes with Lena, the dancers, Adrian Hedley, Paul Nicholas and Wayne Sleep singing "Give My Regards to Broadway" from the musical Little Johnny Jones; the end credits are run while they perform this song.

References

External links
 

BBC television musicals
British musical television series